Patrick Carr may refer to:
 Patrick Carr (Boston Massacre) (died 1770), victim of the Boston Massacre
 Patrick Eugene Carr (1922–1998), United States district judge
 Patrick Carr (American football) (born 1995), American football running back
 Patrick Carr, author whose works include co-authorship of the autobiography of Johnny Cash

See also
 Patrick-Carr-Herring House, a historic home located at Clinton, Sampson County, North Carolina